Pet Rock is a collectible toy made in 1975 by advertising executive Gary Dahl.  They were rocks packaged in custom cardboard boxes complete with ventilation holes and straw bedding imitating a pet carrier. The fad lasted about six months, ending after a short increase in sales during the Christmas season of December 1975. Although by February 1976 they were discounted due to lower sales, Dahl sold over 1 million Pet Rocks for $4 each, and became a millionaire.

With his money, Dahl opened a bar named "Carry Nations" in downtown Los Gatos, California, a reference to Carrie Nation. Dahl continued to work in advertising; however, he avoided interviews for years. He has said this was because "a bunch of wackos" harassed him with lawsuits and threats. Dahl said in 1988, "Sometimes I look back and wonder if my life would have been simpler if I hadn't done it."

Development
Gary Dahl came up with the idea in a bar while listening to his friends complain about their pets; this gave him the idea for the perfect "pet": a rock. A rock would not need to be fed, walked, bathed, or groomed, and it would not die, become sick, or be disobedient. Dahl said that they were to be the perfect pets and joked about it with his friends.
Dahl took his "pet" idea seriously, however, and drafted an instruction manual for a pet rock. The manual was full of puns and gags that referred to the rock as an actual pet.

Dahl's biggest expense was the die-cutting and manufacture of the boxes. The rocks cost only one cent each, and the straw was nearly free. For the initial run of booklets, Dahl had a printing job for a client, and "tacked" the pet rock booklet onto the main job. This resulted in a batch requiring only a cut and trim, at almost no cost to him.

Training manual
A 32-page official training manual titled The Care and Training of Your Pet Rock was included, with instructions on how to properly raise and care for one's new Pet Rock (notably lacking instructions for feeding, bathing, changing, and so on). The instruction manual contained gags, puns and jokes, and listed several commands that could be taught to the new pet. While "sit" and "stay" were effortless to accomplish, "roll over" usually required a little extra help from the trainer. "Come," "stand" and "shake hands" were found to be near-impossible to teach; however, "attack" was fairly simple (with some help from the owner's force).

In popular culture

 Zoe from Sesame Street owns a pet rock called Rocco. A video of Elmo from Sesame Street shouting at Zoe's Pet Rock went viral in early 2022.
 In June 2022 it was noted that NASA's Mars rover Perseverance had picked up a rock from the surface of Mars in one of its wheel wells, and the rock had stayed in the rover's wheel well for over five miles of travel. Workers and followers of the mission affectionately referred to the rock as Perseverance's "pet rock." In February 2023 Perseverance was not only still in possession of its pet rock, it had picked up a second.
 Minions: The Rise of Gru included a pet rock given as a gift at a child's birthday party.
 A24 produced an official licensed Pet Rock as a tie-in for the film Everything Everywhere All at Once. This version of the Pet Rock has a pair of googly eyes attached in reference to a scene from that film. Also included are the straw bedding and instructions of the original, and a new version of the ventilated box printed with scenery from the film.

References

External links

Pet Rock in Top 10 Toy Crazes by Time magazine

Products introduced in 1975
1970s fads and trends
1970s toys
Novelty items
Rocks
Virtual pets
Products and services discontinued in 1976